Cixilo (7th-century – fl. 694) was a Visigoth queen consort by marriage to king Egica (687–702).

She was the daughter of Erwig and Liuvigoto. She married Egica in 670. She was repudiated in 687. She was, however, only temporary moved to a convent, and allowed to returned and resinstated as queen, being attested in 691 as well as 694.

:es:Cixilo

References 

Visigothic queens consort
7th-century people of the Visigothic Kingdom
7th-century women